Alberto Javier Ortega Rosa (born 11 July 1978 in Montevideo) is a Uruguayan football midfielder who currently plays for El Tanque Sisley. He currently plays for Curicó Unido in Chile.

References

 Profile at BoliviaGol.com 

1978 births
Living people
Uruguayan footballers
Association football midfielders
Sportivo Cerrito players
C.A. Cerro players
Club Aurora players
Curicó Unido footballers
Deportes Copiapó footballers
Independiente F.B.C. footballers
El Tanque Sisley players
Primera B de Chile players
Chilean Primera División players
Expatriate footballers in Bolivia
Expatriate footballers in Chile
Expatriate footballers in Paraguay
Uruguayan expatriates in Chile
Uruguayan expatriates in Bolivia
Uruguayan expatriates in Paraguay